Carex appressa, the tall sedge, is a species of flowering plant in the family Cyperaceae. It is native to New Guinea, Australia, New Zealand, and generally in the South West Pacific.

Description

Habitat and ecology

Carex appressa occurs in swamps, watercourses, and occasionally in water. It also serves as a larval food plant for Heteronympha cordace.

References 

appressa
Flora of New Guinea
Flora of Australia
Flora of the South Island
Flora of New Caledonia
Plants described in 1810
Taxa named by Robert Brown (botanist, born 1773)